

C

Ca 

 
  
 

 

Cabalzarite (tsumcorite: IMA1997-012) 8.CG.15   [no] (IUPAC: calcium dimagnesium diarsenate dihydrate)
Cabriite (alloy: IMA1981-057) 1.AG.30    (IUPAC: dipalladium copper stannide)
Cabvinite (IMA2016-011) 3.D0.  [no] [no] (IUPAC: dithorium hydro heptafluoride trihydrate)
Cacoxenite (Y: 1826) 8.DC.40   
Cadmium (IMA1980-086a) 1.AB.05   
Cadmoindite (spinel, linnaeite: IMA2003-042) 2.DA.05    (IUPAC: cadmium diindium tetrasulfide)
Cadmoselite (wurtzite: 1957) 2.CB.45    (IUPAC: cadmium selenide)
CadwaladeriteQ (Y: 1941) 3.BD.05   

Caesiumpharmacosiderite (pharmacosiderite: IMA2013-096) 8.CJ.  [no] [no] (IUPAC: caesium tetrairon [tetrahydro triarsenate] tetrahydrate)
Cafarsite (IMA1965-036) 4.JC.05   
Cafetite (IMA1962 s.p., 1959) 4.FL.75    (IUPAC: calcium dititanium pentaoxide monohydrate)
Cahnite (zircon: 1927) 6.AC.70    (IUPAC: dicalcium tetrahydro boro-arsenate)
Cairncrossite (gyrolite: IMA2013-012) 9.EE.  [no] [no]
Calamaite (IMA2016-036) 7.0  [no] [no] (IUPAC: disodium titanium oxodisulfate dihydrate)
Calaverite (calaverite: 1868) 2.EA.10    (IUPAC: gold ditelluride)
Calciborite (Y: 1956) 6.BC.10    (IUPAC: calcium tetraoxo diborate)
Calcinaksite (litidionite: IMA2013-081) 9.D?.  [no] [no] (IUPAC: potassium sodium calcium (decaoxo tetrasilicate) monohydrate)
Calcioancylite 5.DC.05
Calcioancylite-(Ce) (ancylite: IMA1987 s.p., 1923) 5.DC.05   
Calcioancylite-(La) (ancylite: IMA2021-090) 5.DC.05
Calcioancylite-(Nd) (ancylite: IMA1989-008) 5.DC.05    (Nd2.8Ca1.2(CO3)4(OH)3·H2O)
Calcioandyrobertsite (andyrobertsite: IMA1997-023) 8.DH.50   [no] (IUPAC: potassium calcium pentacopper tetrarsenate dihydroxoarsenate dihydrate)
Calcioaravaipaite (aravaipaite: IMA1994-018) 3.DC.37    (IUPAC: lead dicalcium alumino-nonafluoride)
Calcioburbankite (burbankite: IMA1993-001) 5.AC.30   
Calciocatapleiite (catapleiite: IMA2007 s.p., 1964) 9.CA.15    (IUPAC: calcium zirconium nonaoxy trisilicate dihydrate)
Calciocopiapite (copiapite: IMA1967 s.p., 1960) 7.DB.35    (IUPAC: calcium tetrairon(III) dihydro hexasulfate icosahydrate)
Calciodelrioite (delrioite: IMA2012-031) 4.HG.  [no]  (IUPAC: calcium di(vanadate(V)) tetrahydrate)
Calcioferrite (calcioferrite: 1858) 8.DH.25    (IUPAC: tetracalcium magnesium tetrairon(III) tetrahydro hexaphosphate dodecahydrate)
Calciohatertite (alluaudite: IMA2021-013)  [no] [no]
Calciohilairite (IMA1984-023) 9.DM.10    (IUPAC: calcium zirconium nonaoxy trisilicate trihydrate)
Calciojohillerite (alluaudite: IMA2016-068) 8.0  [no] [no] (IUPAC: sodium calcium magnesium dimagnesium triarsenate)
Calciolangbeinite (langbeinite: IMA2011-067) 7.AD.  [no]  (IUPAC: dipotassium dicalcium trisulfate)
Calciomurmanite (seidozerite, murmanite: IMA2014-103) 9.B?.  [no] [no]
Calcio-olivine (olivine: IMA2007-B) 9.AD.10   [no] (IUPAC: dicalcium (tetraoxysilicate))
Calciopetersite (mixite: IMA2001-004) 8.DL.15    (IUPAC: calcium hexacopper hexahydro diphosphate hydroxophosphate trihydrate)
Calciosamarskite (samarskite: 1928) 4.DB.25   [no]
Calciotantite (IMA1981-039) 4.DJ.05    (IUPAC: calcium tetratantalum undecaoxide)
Calciouranoite (wölsendorfite: IMA1973-004) 4.GB.20   
Calcioursilite (ursilite: 1957) 9.AK.35  [no] [no]
Calcite (calcite: old/ 1836) 5.AB.05    (IUPAC: calcium carbonate)
Calcjarlite (jarlite: 1970) 3.CC.20   
Calclacite (Y: 1945) 10.AA.25    (IUPAC: calcium chloro acetate pentahydrate)
Calcurmolite (IMA1988-xxx, 1959) 7.HB.15   
Calcybeborosilite-(Y)Q (gadolinite: 1963, 2000) 9.AJ.20   [no] Note: might be gadolinite-(Y) 
Calderite (garnet, garnet: 1909) 9.AD.25    (IUPAC: trimanganese(II) diiron(III) tri(tetraoxysilicate))
Calderónite (brackebuschite: IMA2001-022) 8.BG.05   [no] (IUPAC: dilead iron(III) hydro divanadate)
Caledonite (Y: 1832) 7.BC.50    (IUPAC: dicopper pentalead hexahydro trisulfate carbonate)
Calkinsite-(Ce) (IMA1987 s.p., 1953) 5.CC.25    (IUPAC: dicerium tricarbonate tetrahydrate)
Callaghanite (Y: 1954) 5.DA.25    (IUPAC: dicopper dimagnesium hexahydro carbonate dihydrate)
Calomel (Y: old) 3.AA.30    (IUPAC: (dimercury) dichloride)
Calumetite (anthonyite: IMA1967 s.p., 1963) 3.DA.40    (IUPAC: calcium tetracopper octahydro dichloride (3.5)hydrate)
Calvertite (IMA2006-030) 2.CA.15    (Cu5Ge0.5S4)
Calzirtite (IMA1967 s.p., 1961) 4.DL.10    (IUPAC: dicalcium pentazirconium dititanium hexadecaoxide)
Camanchacaite (alluaudite: IMA2018-025) 8.0  [no] [no] (IUPAC: sodium vacancy calcium dimagnesium diarsenate dihydroxoarsenate)
Cámaraite (seidozerite, bafertisite: IMA2009-011) 9.B?.  [no] 
Camaronesite (taranakite: IMA2012-094) 8.0  [no] [no]
Camérolaite (cyanotrichite: IMA1990-036) 7.DE.75    (Cu4Al2()
Cameronite (IMA1984-069) 2.DB.35   
Camgasite (IMA1988-031) 8.DJ.15    (IUPAC: calcium magnesium hydro arsenate pentahydrate)
Caminite (IMA1983-015) 7.BB.05    (IUPAC: heptamagnesium tetrahydro pentasulfate monohydrate)
Campigliaite (devilline: IMA1981-001) 7.DD.30    (IUPAC: tetracopper manganese(II) hexahydro disulfate tetrahydrate)
Campostriniite (görgeyite: IMA2013-086a) 7.CD.  [no] [no]
Canaphite (IMA1983-067) 8.FC.10    (IUPAC: disodium calcium pyrophosphate tetrahydrate)
Canasite (IMA1962 s.p., 1959) 9.DG.80    (K3Na3Ca5Si12O30(OH)4)
Canavesite (IMA1977-025) 6.H0.50    (IUPAC: dimagnesium hydroxoborate carbonate pentahydrate)
Cancrinite (cancrinite: 1833) 9.FB.05   
Cancrisilite (cancrinite: IMA1990-013) 9.FB.05   
Canfieldite (argyrodite: 1894) 2.BA.70    (IUPAC: octasilver hexasulfa stannide)
Cannizzarite (Y: 1924) 2.JB.20    (IUPAC: octalead tricosasulfa decabismuthide)
Cannonite (IMA1992-002) 7.BD.35    (IUPAC: dibismuth dihydro oxosulfate)
Canosioite (brackebuschite: IMA2015-030) 8.BG.  [no] [no] (IUPAC: dibarium iron(III) hydro diarsenate)
Canutite (alluaudite: IMA2013-070) 8.0  [no] [no] (IUPAC: sodium vacancy trimanganese arsenate di(hydroxoarsenate))
Caoxite (oxalate: IMA1996-012) 10.AB.50    (IUPAC: calcium oxalate trihydrate)
Capgaronnite (IMA1990-011) 2.FC.20a    (IUPAC: silver mercury chloro sulfide)
Cappelenite-(Y) (IMA1987 s.p., 1884) 9.AJ.30    (BaY6B6Si3O24F2)
Capranicaite (IMA2009-086) 9.DB.50  [no]  (KCaNaAl4B4Si2O18)
Caracolite (apatite: 1886) 7.BD.20    (IUPAC: disodium (dilead sodium) chloro trisulfate)
Carboborite (IMA1967 s.p., 1964) 6.AC.50    (IUPAC: dicalcium magnesium di(tetrahydro borate) dicarbonate tetrahydrate)
Carbobystrite (cancrinite: IMA2009-028) 9.FB.05  [no] 
Carbocalumite (hydrotalcite: IMA2021-106) 4.FL.  [no] [no]
Carbocernaite (carbocernaite: IMA1967 s.p., 1961) 5.AB.50   
Carboirite (IMA1980-066) 9.J0.05   [no] (IUPAC: iron(II) dialuminium germanium pentaoxo dihydroxy)
Carbokentbrooksite (eudialyte: IMA2002-056) 9.CO.10   [no]
Carbonatecyanotrichite (cyanotrichite: IMA1967 s.p., 1963) 7.DE.10    (IUPAC: tetracopper dialuminium dodecahydro carbonate dihydrate)
Cardite (IMA2015-125) 8.0  [no] [no] (IUPAC: (5.5)zinc diarsenate trihydro hydroxoarsenate trihydrate)
Carducciite (IMA2013-006) 2.HB.  [no] [no]
Caresite (hydrotalcite: IMA1992-030) 5.DA.40    (IUPAC: tetrairon(II) dialuminium dodecahydro carbonate trihydrate)
Carletonite (carletonite: IMA1969-016) 9.EB.20   
Carletonmooreite (silicide: IMA2018-068) 1.0  [no] [no] (IUPAC: trinickel silicide)
Carlfrancisite (hematolite: IMA2012-033) 8.BE.45  [no] [no]
Carlfriesite (IMA1973-013) 4.JK.25    (IUPAC: calcium ditellurium(IV) tellurium(VI) octaoxide)
Carlgieseckeite-(Nd) (apatite: IMA2010-036) 8.BN.05  [no]  (IUPAC: sodium niobium tricalcium fluoro triphosphate)
Carlhintzeite (IMA1978-031) 3.CB.45    (IUPAC: dicalcium heptafluoroaluminate monohydrate)
Carlinite (IMA1974-062) 2.BD.25    (IUPAC: dithallium sulfide)
Carlosbarbosaite (IMA2010-047) 4.0  [no]  (IUPAC: diuranyl diniobium hexaoxo dihydroxy dihydrate)
Carlosruizite (IMA1993-020) 7.DG.40    (IUPAC: tripotassium pentasodium pentamagnesium hexaiodate hexaselenate hexahydrate)
Carlosturanite (IMA1984-009) 9.DJ.25   
Carlsbergite (nitride, rocksalt: IMA1971-026) 1.BC.15    (IUPAC: chromium nitride)
Carlsonite (metavoltine: IMA2014-067) 7.0  [no] [no] (IUPAC: pentammonium triiron(III) oxohexasulfate heptahydrate)
Carmeltazite (IMA2018-103) 4.0  [no] [no] (IUPAC: zirconium dialuminium tetratitanium undecaoxide)
Carmichaelite (IMA1996-062) 4.DB.50   
Carminite (carminite: 1850) 8.BH.30    (IUPAC: lead diiron(III) dihydro diarsenate)
Carnallite (carnallite: 1856) 3.BA.10    (IUPAC: potassium magnesium trichloride hexahydrate)
Carnotite (Y: 1899) 4.HB.05    (IUPAC: dipotassium diuranyl divanadate trihydrate)
Carobbiite (halite, rocksalt: 1956) 3.AA.20    (IUPAC: potassium fluoride)
Carpathite (IMA1971 s.p., 1955) 10.BA.30    (IUPAC: coronene, a polycyclic aromatic hydrocarbon (PAH))
Carpholite (carpholite: 1817) 9.DB.05    (IUPAC: manganese(II) dialuminium hexaoxy disilicate tetrahydroxyl)
Carraraite (ettringite: IMA1998-002) 7.DG.15    (IUPAC: tricalcium germanium hexahydro sulfate carbonate dodecahydrate)
CarrboyditeQ (hydrotalcite: IMA1974-033) 7.DD.35   
Carrollite (spinel, linnaeite: 1852) 2.DA.05    (IUPAC: copper dicobalt tetrasulfide)
Caryinite (alluaudite: IMA1980 s.p., 1874) 8.AC.10    (IUPAC: sodium calcium calcium dimanganese triarsenate)
Caryochroite (IMA2005-031) 9.HA.65   [no]
Caryopilite (serpentine: IMA1967 s.p., 1889) 9.ED.15   
Cascandite (pectolite: IMA1980-011) 9.DG.07   
Caseyite (IMA2019-002) 4.0  [no] [no]
Cassagnaite (ardennite: IMA2006-019a) 9.BJ.65   
Cassedanneite (IMA1984-063) 7.FC.20    (IUPAC: pentalead divanadate dichromate monohydrate)
Cassidyite (fairfiedite: IMA1966-024) 8.CG.05    (IUPAC: dicalcium nickel diphosphate dihydrate)
Cassiterite (rutile: 1832) 4.DB.05    (IUPAC: tin dioxide)
Castellaroite (IMA2015-071) 8.CD.  [no] [no] (IUPAC: trimanganese(III) diarsenate (4.5)hydrate)
Caswellsilverite (IMA1981-012a) 2.FB.05    (IUPAC: sodium chromium sulfide)
Catalanoite (IMA2002-008) 8.CJ.70   [no] (IUPAC: disodium hydroxophosphate octahydrate)
Catamarcaite (IMA2003-020) 2.CB.35b   [no] (IUPAC: hexacopper germanium tungsten octasulfide)
Catapleiite (catapleiite: 1850) 9.CA.15    (IUPAC: disodium zirconium nonaoxytrisilicate dihydrate) 
Cattierite (pyrite: 1945) 2.EB.05a    (IUPAC: cobalt disulfide)
Cattiite (IMA2000-032) 8.CE.50   [no] (IUPAC: trimagnesium diphosphate docosahydrate)
Cavansite (IMA1967-019) 9.EA.50   
Cavoite (IMA2001-024) 4.HE.40    (IUPAC: calcium trivanadium heptaoxide)
Cayalsite-(Y) (IMA2011-094) 9.0  [no] 
Caysichite-(Y) (IMA1973-044) 9.DJ.15

Ce – Ch 
Cebaite 5.BD.15 (IUPAC: tribarium diREE difluoro pentacarbonate)
Cebaite-(Ce) (IMA1987 s.p., 1983) 5.BD.15   
Cebaite-(Nd)N (Y: 2000) 5.BD.15   [no]
CebolliteQ (Y: 1914) 9.BB.10    Note: incomplete description.   
Čechite (IMA1980-068) 8.BH.40    (IUPAC: lead iron(II) hydro vanadate)
Čejkaite (IMA1999-045) 5.ED.50   [no] (IUPAC: tetrasodium uranyl tricarbonate)
Celadonite (mica: IMA1998 s.p., 1847) 9.EC.15   
Celestine (IMA1967 s.p., 1791) 7.AD.35    (IUPAC: strontium sulfate)
Celleriite (tourmaline: IMA2019-089) 9.CK.  [no] [no]
Celsian (Y: 1895) 9.FA.30   
Centennialite (IMA2013-110) 3.DA.  [no] [no]
Cerchiaraite 9.CF.25
Cerchiaraite-(Al) (cerchiaraite: IMA2012-011) 9.CF.25  [no] [no] 
Cerchiaraite-(Fe) (cerchiaraite: IMA2012-012) 9.CF.25  [no] [no] 
Cerchiaraite-(Mn) (cerchiaraite: IMA1999-012) 9.CF.25   [no]
Cerianite-(Ce) (IMA1987 s.p., 1955) 4.DL.05    (IUPAC: cerium dioxide)
Cerite-(Ce) (cerite: IMA1987 s.p., 1804) 9.AG.20   
CeriumQ (Y: 2002) 1.0  [no] [no]
Černýite (stannite: IMA1976-057) 2.CB.15a    (IUPAC: dicopper cadmium tin tetrasulfide)

Cerromojonite (IMA2018-040) 2.0  [no] [no]
Ceruléite (IMA2007 s.p., 1900) 8.DE.25    (IUPAC: dicopper heptaluminium tridecahydro tetrarsenate (11.5)hydrate)
Cerussite (Y: 1565) 5.AB.15    (IUPAC: lead carbonate)
Cervandonite-(Ce) (IMA1986-044) 9.BE.92   
Cervantite (cervantite: IMA1962 s.p., 1850 Rd) 4.DE.30    (IUPAC: antimony(III) antimony(V) tetraoxide)
Cervelleite (IMA1986-018) 2.BA.60    (IUPAC: tetrasilver telluride sulfide)
Cesanite (apatite: IMA1980-023) 7.BD.20    (IUPAC: dicalcium trisodium hydro trisulfate)
Césarferreiraite (laueite, laueite: IMA2012-099) 8.DC.  [no] [no] (IUPAC: iron(II) diiron(III) diarsenate octahydrate)
Cesàrolite (Y: 1920) 4.FG.10    (IUPAC: lead dihydro trimanganese(IV) hexaoxide)
Cesbronite (tellurium oxysalt: IMA2017-C, IMA1974-006) 4.JN.15    (IUPAC: tricopper tellurium(VI) tetrahydro tetraoxide)
Cesiodymite (IMA2016-002) 7.0  [no] [no] (IUPAC: caesium potassium pentacopper oxopentasulfate)
Cesiokenopyrochlore (pyrochlore: IMA2016-104) 4.DH.  [no] [no]
Cesplumtantite (IMA1985-040) 4.DM.15    (IUPAC: dicaesium trilead octatantalum tetracosaoxide)
Cetineite (IMA1986-019) 2.MA.05    (NaK5Sb14S6O18·6H2O)
Chabazite 9.GD.10 (chain of 6-membered rings – tabular zeolite)
Chabazite-Ca (zeolitic tectosilicate: IMA1997 s.p., 1792) 9.GD.10   
Chabazite-K (zeolitic tectosilicate: IMA1997 s.p., 1997) 9.GD.10   [no]
Chabazite-Mg (zeolitic tectosilicate: IMA2009-060) 9.GD.10?  [no] [no]
Chabazite-Na (zeolitic tectosilicate: IMA1997 s.p.) 9.GD.10   [no]
Chabazite-Sr (zeolitic tectosilicate: IMA1999-040) 9.GD.10   [no]
Chabournéite (chabournéite: IMA1976-042) 2.HC.05e   
Chadwickite (IMA1997-005) 4.JA.60   [no] (IUPAC: uranyl hydrogenarsenite)
Chaidamuite (IMA1985-011) 7.DC.30    (IUPAC: zinc iron(III) hydro disulfate tetrahydrate)
Chalcanthite (Y: 1853) 7.CB.20    (IUPAC: copper sulfate pentahydrate)
(Chalcedony: a cryptocrystalline form of silica, composed of very fine intergrowths of quartz and moganite)
Chalcoalumite (Y: 1925) 7.DD.75    (IUPAC: copper tetraluminium dodecahydro sulfate trihydrate)
Chalcocite (Y: old/ 1751) 2.BA.05    (IUPAC: dicopper sulfide)
Chalcocyanite (Y: 1873) 7.AB.10    (IUPAC: copper sulfate)
Chalcomenite (Y: 1881) 4.JH.05    (IUPAC: copper selenite(IV) dihydrate) 
Chalconatronite (Y: 1955) 5.CB.40    (IUPAC: disodium copper dicarbonate trihydrate)
Chalcophanite (Y: 1875) 4.FL.20    (IUPAC: zinc trimanganese(IV) heptaoxide trihydrate)
Chalcophyllite (Y: 1801) 8.DF.30    (Cu18Al2(AsO4)4(SO4)3(OH)24·36H2O)
Chalcopyrite (chalcopyrite: 1725?) 2.CB.10a    (IUPAC: copper(I) iron(III) disulfide)
Chalcosiderite (Y: 1814) 8.DD.15    (IUPAC: copper hexairon(III) octahydro tetraphosphate tetrahydrate)
Chalcostibite (chalcostibite: 1835) 2.HA.05    (IUPAC: copper antimonide disulfide)
Chalcothallite (IMA1966-008) 2.BD.40   
Challacolloite (IMA2004-028) 3.AA.55    (IUPAC: potassium dilead pentachloride)
Chambersite (IMA1967 s.p., 1962) 6.GA.05    (tecto-heptaborate)
Chaméanite (IMA1980-088) 2.LA.35   
Chamosite (chlorite: 1820) 9.EC.55   
Chanabayaite (triazolate: IMA2013-065) 10.0  [no] [no]
Changesite-(Y) (cerite: IMA2022-023)
Changbaiite (Y: 1978) 4.DF.10    (IUPAC: lead diniobium hexaoxide)
Changchengite (IMA1995-047) 2.EB.25    (IUPAC: iridium bismuthide sulfide)
Changoite (IMA1997-041) 7.CC.50    (IUPAC: disodium zinc disulfate tetrahydrate)
Chantalite (IMA1977-001) 9.AG.55   
Chaoite (IMA1968-019) 1.CB.05b   
Chapmanite (IMA1968 s.p., 1924) 9.ED.25   
Charleshatchettite (IMA2015-048) 4.0  [no] [no]
Charlesite (ettringite: IMA1981-043) 7.DG.15   
Charmarite (hydrotalcite: IMA1992-026) 5.DA.40    (IUPAC: tetramanganese dialuminium dodecahydro carbonate trihydrate)
Charoite (IMA1977-019) 9.DG.92   
Chatkalite (IMA1981-004) 2.CB.20    (IUPAC: hexacopper iron ditin octasulfide)
Chayesite (milarite: IMA1987-059) 9.CM.05   
Chegemite (IMA2008-038) 9.AF.    (IUPAC: heptacalcium tritetraoxysilicate trihydroxyl)
Chekhovichite (IMA1986-039) 4.JK.35    (IUPAC: dibismuth(III) tetratellurium(IV) undecaoxide)
Chelkarite (Y: 1968) 6.H0.05   
Chenevixite (Y: 1866) 8.DD.05   
Chengdeite (auricupride: IMA1994-023) 1.AG.35    (IUPAC: triiridium iron alloy)
Chenguodaite (IMA2004-042a) 2.BA.60   [no] (IUPAC: nonasilver iron ditelluride tetrasulfide)
Chenite (IMA1983-069) 7.BC.70    (IUPAC: copper tetralead hexahydro disulfate)
Chenmingite (IMA2017-036) 4.BB.  [no] [no]
Cheralite (IMA2005-F, 1953) 8.AD.50    (IUPAC: calcium thorium diphosphate)
Cheremnykhite (vanadate-tellurium oxysalt: IMA1989-017) 8.DL.20    (IUPAC: trilead trizinc tellurium hexaoxo divanadate)
Cherepanovite (modderite: IMA1984-041) 2.CC.15    (IUPAC: rhenium arsenide)
Chernikovite (IMA1988 s.p., IMA1985-M) 8.EB.15    
Chernovite-(Y) (zircon: IMA1967-027) 8.AD.35    (IUPAC: yttrium arsenate)
Chernykhite (mica: IMA1972-006) 9.EC.15    (BaV3+2(Si2Al2)O10(OH)2)
Chervetite (IMA1967 s.p., 1963) 8.FA.15    (IUPAC: dilead divanadium(V) heptaoxide)
Chesnokovite (IMA2006-007) 9.AC.20    (IUPAC: disodium (dioxysilicate dihydroxyl) octahydrate)
Chessexite (IMA1981-054) 7.DG.35    (Na4Ca2Mg3Al8(SiO4)2(SO4)10(OH)10·40H2O)
Chesterite (IMA1977-010) 9.DF.05    (Mg17Si20O54(OH)6)
Chestermanite (orthopinakiolite: IMA1986-058) 6.AB.40   
Chevkinite-(Ce) (chevkinite: IMA1987 s.p., 1842) 9.BE.70   
Chiappinoite-(Y) (IMA2014-040) 9.0  [no] [no] (IUPAC: diyttrium manganese tetra(heptaoxy trisilicate))
Chiavennite (zeolitic tectosilicate: IMA1981-038) 9.GF.25    (CaMn2+(BeOH)2Si5O13·2H2O)
Chibaite (IMA2008-067) 10.0  [no] [no]
Chihmingite (IMA2022-010)
Chihuahuaite (magnetoplumbite: IMA2009-027 Rn) 04.CC.45  [no] [no]
Childrenite (Y: 1823) 8.DD.20    (IUPAC: iron(II) aluminium dihydro phosphate monohydrate)
Chiluite (IMA1988-001) 7.BD.55   
Chinleite 7.0
Chinleite-(Nd) (IMA2022-051)
Chinleite-(Y) (IMA2016-017) 7.0  [no] [no] (IUPAC: sodium yttrium disulfate monohydrate)
Chiolite (Y: 1846) 3.CE.05   
Chiyokoite (ettringite: IMA2019-054) 6.0  [no] [no]
Chirvinskyite (IMA2016-051) 9.B?.  [no] [no]
Chistyakovaite (IMA2005-003) 8.EB.20    (IUPAC: aluminium diuranyl (fluoro,hydro) diarsenate (6.5)hydrate)
Chivruaiite (IMA2004-052) 9.DG.45   [no]
Chkalovite (Y: 1939) 9.DM.20   
Chladniite (IMA1993-010) 8.AC.50    (IUPAC: disodium calcium heptamagnesium hexaphosphate)
Chloraluminite (Y: 1872) 3.BC.05    (IUPAC: aluminium trichloride hexahydrate)
Chlorapatite (apatite: IMA2010 s.p., 1860) 8.BN.05    (IUPAC: pentacalcium chloro triphosphate)
Chlorargyrite (IMA1962 s.p., 1902) 3.AA.15    (IUPAC: silver(I) chloride)
Chlorartinite (IMA1996-005) 5.DA.10    (IUPAC: dimagnesium chloro hydro carbonate (2.5)hydrate)
Chlorbartonite (IMA2000-048) 2.FC.10   [no] (IUPAC: hexapotassium tetracosairon chloro hexacosasulfide)
Chlorellestadite (apatite: IMA2017-013, IMA2010 s.p., IMA2008 s.p., IMA1981-B) 9.AH.25   
Chloritoid (Y: 1832) 9.AF.85    (IUPAC: iron(II) dialuminium oxy tetraoxysilicate dihydroxyl)
Chlorkyuygenite (IMA2013-C, IMA2012-046 Rn) 4.0  [no] [no]
Chlormagaluminite (hydrotalcite: IMA1980-098) 5.DA.45    (IUPAC: tetramagnesium dialuminium dichloro dodecahydroxide diwater)
Chlormanganokalite (Y: 1906) 3.CJ.05    (IUPAC: tetrapotassium manganese hexachloride)
Chlormayenite (IMA2013-C, IMA1963-016) 4.CC.20    (IUPAC: dodecacalcium tetradecaluminium dichloro ditricontaoxide)
Chlorocalcite (Y: 1872) 3.AA.40    (IUPAC: potassium calcium trichloride)
ChloromagnesiteQ (Y: 1873) 3.AB.20  [no] [no] (IUPAC: magnesium dichloride)
Chloromenite (IMA1996-048) 4.JG.10    (IUPAC: nonacopper hexachloro dioxo tetraselenite(IV))
Chlorophoenicite (Y: 1924) 8.BE.35   
Chlorothionite (Y: 1872) 7.BC.25    (IUPAC: dipotassium copper dichloro sulfate) 
Chloroxiphite (Y: 1923) 3.DB.30    (IUPAC: trilead copper dihydro dioxy dichloride)
Choloalite (IMA1980-019) 4.JK.45   
Chondrodite (Y: 1817) 9.AF.45   
Chongite (IMA2015-039) 8.0  [no] [no] (IUPAC: tricalcium dimagnesium diarsenate dihydroxoarsenate tetrahydrate)
Chopinite (olivine: IMA2006-004) 8.AB.15   [no] (IUPAC: trimagnesium diphosphate)
Chovanite (IMA2009-055) 2.JB.35e  [no]  
Chrisstanleyite (chrisstanleyite: IMA1996-044) 2.BC.15    (IUPAC: disilver tripalladium tetraselenide)
Christelite (IMA1995-030) 7.DD.25    (IUPAC: trizinc dicopper hexahydro disulfate tetrahydrate)
Christite (IMA1976-015) 2.HD.15    (IUPAC: thallium mercury arsenide trisulfide)
Christofschäferite-(Ce) (chevkinite: IMA2011-107) 9.B?.  [no] 
Chromatite (zircon: IMA1967 s.p., 1963) 7.FA.10    (IUPAC: calcium chromate (VI))
Chrombismite (IMA1995-044) 4.CC.05    (IUPAC: hexadecabismuth chromium heptacosaoxide)
Chromceladonite (mica: IMA1999-024) 9.EC.15   [no]
Chromferide (alloy: IMA1984-021) 1.AE.15   
Chromio-pargasite [Ca-amphibole: IMA2012 s.p., ehimeite (IMA2011-023)] 9.DE.15  [no] 
Chromite (spinel, spinel: 1845) 4.BB.05    (IUPAC: iron(II) chromate)
Chromium (iron: IMA1980-094) 1.AE.05   
Chromium-dravite (tourmaline: IMA1982-055) 9.CK.05   
Chromo-alumino-povondraite (tourmaline: IMA2013-089 with new type material, IMA2009-088 D) 9.CK.05  [no] [no]
Chromphyllite (IMA1995-052) 9.EC.15   [no]
Chromschieffelinite (lead-tellurium oxysalt: IMA2011-003) 7.DF.  [no] 
Chrysoberyl (olivine: 1789) 4.BA.05    (IUPAC: beryllium dialuminium tetraoxide)
Chrysocolla (a mineral) (a mineraloid) (IMA1980 s.p., 315 BC) 9.ED.20   
Chrysothallite (IMA2013-008) 3.0  [no] [no] (IUPAC: hexapotassium hexacopper thallium(III) tetrahydro heptadecachloride monohydrate)
Chrysotile (IMA2007 s.p., 1834 Rd) 9.ED.15   [no]
Chubarovite (IMA2014-018) 6.0  [no] [no] (IUPAC: potassium dizinc dichloro borate)
Chukochenite (IMA2018-132a) 4.0  [no] [no] (IUPAC: lithium octaoxo pentaaluminate)
Chukotkaite (IMA2019-124) 2.0  [no] [no] (AgPb7Sb5S15)
Chudobaite (IMA1962 s.p.) 8.CE.05    (IUPAC: pentamagnesium diarsenate di(hydroxoarsenate) decahydrate)
Chukanovite (malachite: IMA2005-039) 5.BA.10    (IUPAC: diiron dihydro carbonate)
Chukhrovite 3.CG.10
Chukhrovite-(Ca) (IMA2010-081) 3.CG.10  [no]  
Chukhrovite-(Ce) (IMA1987 s.p., 1979) 3.CG.10   
Chukhrovite-(Nb) (IMA2004-023) 3.CG.10   [no]
Chukhrovite-(Y) (IMA1987 s.p., 1960) 3.CG.10   
Churchite-(Y) (IMA1987 s.p., 1865) 8.CJ.50    (IUPAC: yttrium phosphate dihydrate)
Chursinite (IMA1982-047a) 8.AD.60    (IUPAC: [dimercury] dimercury(II) diarsenate)
Chvaleticeite (IMA1984-059) 7.CB.25    (IUPAC: manganese sulfate hexahydrate)
Chvilevaite (IMA1987-017) 2.FB.10   

Ci – Co 
Cianciulliite (IMA1990-042) 4.FL.55    (IUPAC: dimagnesium manganese(II) dizinc decahydroxide (2-4)hydrate)
Cinnabar (Theophrastus, 315 BC) 2.CD.15a    (IUPAC: mercury sulfide)
Ciprianiite (hellandite: IMA2001-021) 9.DK.20   [no] (Ca4ThCeAlSi4B4O22(OH)2)
Ciriottiite (madocite: IMA2015-027) 2.0  [no] [no]
CirroliteQ (Y: 1868) 8.BH.20  [no] [no] (IUPAC: tricalcium dialuminium trihydro triphosphate)
Clairite (IMA1982-093) 7.DF.55    (IUPAC: diammonium triiron(III) trihydro tetrasulfate trihydrate)
Claraite (IMA1981-023) 5.DA.30    (IUPAC: tricopper(II) tetrahydro carbonate tetrahydrate) 
Claringbullite (IMA2015-L, IMA1976-029 Rd) 3.DA.15    (IUPAC: tetracopper(II) heptahydroxide chloride)
Clarkeite (Y: 1931) 4.GC.05    (IUPAC: sodium uranyl oxyhydroxide (n)hydrate)
Claudetite (claudetite: 1868) 4.CB.45    (IUPAC: diarsenic trioxide)
Clausthalite (galena, rocksalt: 1832) 2.CD.10    (IUPAC: lead selenide)
Clearcreekite (IMA1999-003) 5.DC.30    (IUPAC: tri[dimercury] dihydro dicarbonate tetrahydrate)
Clerite (berthierite: IMA1995-029) 2.HA.20    (IUPAC: manganese diantimonide tetrasulfide)
Cleusonite (crichtonite: IMA1998-070) 4.CC.40   
Cliffordite (uranyl tellurite: IMA1966-046) 4.JK.75    (IUPAC: uranyl tritellurium(IV) nonaoxide)
Clinoatacamite (atacamite: IMA1993-060) 3.DA.10b    (IUPAC: dicopper trihydroxide chloride)
Clinobehoite (IMA1988-024) 4.FA.05b    (IUPAC: beryllium dihydroxide)
Clinobisvanite (IMA1973-040) 8.AD.65    (IUPAC: bismuth vanadate)
Clinocervantite (clinocervantite: IMA1997-017) 4.DE.30   [no] (IUPAC: antimony(III) antimony(V) tetraoxide)
ClinochalcomeniteN (Y: 1981) 4.JH.10    (IUPAC: copper selenite dihydrate)
Clinochlore (chlorite: 1851) 9.EC.55   
Clinoclase (Y: 1830) 8.BE.20    (IUPAC: tricopper trihydro arsenate)
Clinoenstatite (pyroxene: IMA1988 s.p., 1906) 9.DA.10    (IUPAC: dimagnesium hexaoxy disilicate)
Clino-ferri-holmquistite [Li-amphibole: IMA2014 s.p., ferri-ottoliniite (IMA2001-067)] 9.DE.   [no]
Clino-ferro-ferri-holmquistite [Li-amphibole: IMA2012 s.p., ferri-clinoferroholmquistite (IMA2001-066)] 9.DE.25   [no]
Clinoferrosilite (pyroxene: IMA1988 s.p., 1935) 9.DA.10    (IUPAC: diiron(II) hexaoxy disilicate)
Clinohedrite (Y: 1866) 9.AE.30    (IUPAC: calcium zinc tetraoxysilicate monohydrate)
Clinohumite (humite: 1876) 9.AF.55    (IUPAC: nonamagnesium tetra(tetraoxysilicate) difluoride)
Clinojimthompsonite (IMA1977-012) 9.DF.05    (Mg5Si6O16(OH)2)
Clinokurchatovite (IMA1982-017) 6.BA.10    (calcium magnesium pentaoxo diborate) 
Clinometaborite (IMA2010-022) 6.0  [no]  (IUPAC: oxoborinic acid)
Clino-oscarkempffite (lillianite: IMA2012-086) 2.0  [no] [no]
Clinophosinaite (IMA1979-083) 9.CF.15    (IUPAC: trisodium calcium trioxysilicate phosphate)
Clinoptilolite 9.GE.05 (zeolite family, chain of T10O20 tetrahedra)
Clinoptilolite-Ca (zeolitic tectosilicate: IMA1997 s.p., 1977) 9.GE.05   [no] (Ca3(Si30Al6O72)·20H2O)
Clinoptilolite-K (zeolitic tectosilicate: IMA1997 s.p., 1923) 9.GE.05   [no] (K6(Si30Al6O72)·20H2O)
Clinoptilolite-Na (zeolitic tectosilicate: IMA1997 s.p., 1969) 9.GE.05    (Na6(Si30Al6O72)·20H2O)
Clinosafflorite (löllingite: IMA1970-014) 2.EB.15a    (IUPAC: cobalt diarsenide)
Clino-suenoite [Mg-Fe-Mn-amphibole: IMA2016-111] 9.DE.  [no] [no]
Clinotobermorite (tobermorite: IMA1990-005) 9.DG.10    (Ca5Si6O17(H2O)2·(Ca·3H2O))
ClinoungemachiteQ (Y: 1938) 7.DG.10    (IUPAC: tripotassium octasodium iron(III) dihydro hexasulfate decahydrate)
Clinozoisite (epidote, clinozoisite: IMA2006 s.p., 1896) 9.BG.05a    (IUPAC: dicalcium trialuminium (heptaoxodisilicate) (tetraoxysilicate) oxyhydroxyl)
Clintonite (mica: IMA1998 s.p., 1843) 9.EC.35   
Cloncurryite (IMA2005-060) 8.DC.60   [no]
Coalingite (hydrotalcite: IMA1965-011) 5.DA.55    (IUPAC: decamagnesium diiron(III) tetracosahydro carbonate dihydrate) 
Cobaltarthurite (arthurite: IMA2001-052) 8.DC.15   [no] (IUPAC: cobalt diiron(III) dihydro diarsenate tetrahydrate)
Cobaltaustinite (adelite: IMA1987-042) 8.BH.35    (IUPAC: calcium cobalt hydro arsenate)
Cobaltite (cobaltite: 1797) 2.EB.25    (IUPAC: cobalt sulfa arsenide)
Cobaltkieserite (kieserite: IMA2002-004) 7.CB.05   [no] (IUPAC: cobalt sulfate monohydrate)
Cobaltkoritnigite (koritnigite: IMA1980-013) 8.CB.20    (IUPAC: cobalt hydroxoarsenate monohydrate)
Cobaltlotharmeyerite (tsumcorite: IMA1997-027) 8.CG.15   [no] (IUPAC: calcium dicobalt diarsenate dihydrate)
Cobaltneustädtelite (IMA2000-012) 8.BK.10   [no] 
Cobaltoblödite (blödite: IMA2012-059) 7.CC.  [no] [no] (IUPAC: disodium cobalt disulfate tetrahydrate)
Cobaltomenite (cobaltomenite: IMA2007 s.p., 1882) 4.JH.10    (IUPAC: cobalt selenite(IV) dihydrate)
Cobaltpentlandite (pentlandite: IMA1962 s.p., 1959) 2.BB.15    (IUPAC: nonacobalt octasulfide)
Cobalttsumcorite (tsumcorite: IMA1999-029) 8.CG.15   [no] (IUPAC: lead dicobalt diarsenate dihydrate)
Cobaltzippeite (IMA1971-006) 7.EC.05    (IUPAC: cobalt diuranyl dioxo sulfate (3.5)hydrate)
Coccinite (Y: 1845) 3.AB.10   [no] (IUPAC: mercury iodide)
Cochromite (spinel, spinel: IMA1978-049) 4.BB.05    (IUPAC: cobalt dichromium tetraoxide)
Coconinoite (IMA1965-003) 8.EB.35    (IUPAC: diiron(III) dialuminium diuranyl dihydro tetraphosphate sulfate icosahydrate)
Coesite (IMA1962 s.p., 1954) 4.DA.35    (IUPAC: dioxysilicate)
Coffinite (zircon: 1955) 9.AD.30    (IUPAC: uranium tetraoxysilicate (n)hydrate)
Cohenite (perovskite: 1889) 1.BA.05    (IUPAC: triiron carbide)
Coiraite (IMA2005-024) 2.HF.25b   [no]
Coldwellite (IMA2014-045) 2.BC.  [no] [no] (IUPAC: tripalladium disilver sulfide)
Colemanite (Y: 1883) 6.CB.10   
Colimaite (IMA2007-045) 2.FB.25   [no] (IUPAC: tripotassium vanadium tetrasulfide)
Colinowensite (IMA2012-060) 9.0  [no] [no]
Collinsite (fairfieldite: 1927) 8.CG.05    (IUPAC: dicalcium magnesium diphosphate dihydrate)
Colomeraite (pyroxene: IMA2021-061) [no] [no] [no]
Coloradoite (sphalerite: 1878) 2.CB.05a    (IUPAC: mercury telluride)
Colquiriite (IMA1980-015) 3.CB.20    (calcium lithium hexafluoroaluminate) 
Columbite 4.DB.35 (IUPAC: metal diniobium hexaoxide)
Columbite-(Fe) (columbite: IMA2007 s.p., 1805) 4.DB.35   
Columbite-(Mg) (columbite: IMA1967 s.p., 1963) 4.DB.35   
Columbite-(Mn) (columbite: IMA2007 s.p., 1892) 4.DB.35   
Colusite (germanite: 1914) 2.CB.30    (IUPAC: dodecacopper vanadium arsenide hexadecasulfide)
Comancheite (IMA2013-B, IMA1980-077 Rd) 3.DD.65   
Combeite (lovozerite, zirsinalite–lovozerite: 1957) 9.CJ.15a    (Na4.5Ca3.5Si6O17.5(OH)0.5)
Comblainite (hydrotalcite: IMA1978-009) 5.DA.50    (IUPAC: hexanickel dicobalt(III) hexadecahydro carbonate tetrahydrate)
Compreignacite (compreignacite: IMA1964-026) 4.GB.05    (IUPAC: dipotassium hexauranyl hexahydro tetraoxide heptahydrate)
Congolite (boracite: IMA1971-030) 6.GA.10    (Fe2+3B7O13Cl)
Conichalcite (adelite: 1849) 8.BH.35    (IUPAC: calcium copper hydro arsenate)
Connellite (connellite: 1847) 3.DA.25    (Cu36(SO4)(OH)62Cl8·6H2O)
Cookeite (chlorite: 1866) 9.EC.55   
Coombsite (IMA1989-058) 9.EG.35   
Cooperite (Y: 1928) 2.CC.35b    (IUPAC: platinum sulfide)
Coparsite (IMA1996-064) 8.BE.80    (IUPAC: tetracopper(II) chloro dioxo arsenate)
Copiapite (Y: 1833) 7.DB.35    (IUPAC: iron(II) tetrairon(III) dihydro hexasulfate icosahydrate)
Copper (element: old) 1.AA.05   
Coquandite (IMA1991-024) 7.DE.35   
Coquimbite (Y: 1841) 7.CB.55    (IUPAC: diiron(III) trisulfate nonahydrate)
Coralloite (arthurite: IMA2010-012) 8.DC.20  [no] [no] (IUPAC: manganese(II) dimanganese(III) dihydro diarsenate tetrahydrate)
Corderoite (IMA1973-037) 2.FC.15a    (IUPAC: trimercury dichloro disulfide)
Cordierite (beryl: 1813) 9.CJ.10    (IUPAC: dimagnesium trialuminium octadecaoxy alumo pentasilicate)
Cordylite (cordylite) 5.BD.05
Cordylite-(Ce) (IMA2000-C, IMA1987 s.p., 1901) 5.BD.05    (IUPAC: sodium barium dicerium fluoro tetracarbonate)
Cordylite-(La) (IMA2010-058) 5.BD.05  [no]  (IUPAC: sodium barium dilanthanum fluoro tetracarbonate)
Corkite (alunite, beudandite: IMA1987 s.p.) 8.BL.05    (IUPAC: lead triiron(III) hexahydro sulfate phosphate)
Cornetite (Y: 1912) 8.BE.15    (IUPAC: tricopper trihydro phosphate)
Cornubite (IMA1962 s.p., 1959) 8.BD.30    (IUPAC: pentacopper tetrahydro diarsenate)
Cornwallite (Y: 1847) 8.BD.05    (IUPAC: pentacopper tetrahydro diarsenate)
Coronadite (hollandite, coronadite: 1904) 4.DK.05a    (IUPAC: lead hexamanganese(IV) dimanganese(II) hexadecaoxide)
Correianevesite (reddingite: IMA2013-007) 8.0  [no] [no] (IUPAC: iron(II) dimanganese(II) diphosphate trihydrate)
Corrensite (Y: 1954) 9.EC.60   
Low layer charge corrensite (LLC): 1:1 regular interstratification of a trioctahedral chlorite with a trioctahedral vermiculite
High layer charge corrensite (HLC): 1:1 regular interstratification of a trioctahedral chlorite with a trioctahedral smectite
Cortesognoite (lawsonite: 2014–029) 9.0  [no] [no] (IUPAC: calcium divanadium heptaoxy disilicate dihydroxyl hydrate)
Corundum (Y: old/ 1714?) 4.CB.05    (IUPAC: dialuminium trioxide)
Corvusite (straczekite: 1933) 4.HE.20   
Cosalite (Y: 1868) 2.JB.10    (IUPAC: dilead pentasulfa dibismuthide) Note: Cu and Ag might substitute some Pb (Topa, D. and Makovicky, E., 2010).
Coskrenite-(Ce) (sulfate-oxalate: IMA1996-056) 10.AB.65    (IUPAC: dicerium disulfate oxalate octahydrate)
Cossaite (IMA2009-031) 7.0  [no] 
Costibite (löllingite: IMA1969-014) 2.EB.10d    (IUPAC: cobalt antimonide sulfide)
Cotunnite (Y: 1825) 3.DC.85    (IUPAC: lead(II) chloride)
Coulsonite (spinel, spinel: IMA1962 s.p. Rd) 4.BB.05    (IUPAC: iron(II) divanadium(III) tetraoxide)
CousiniteQ (Y: 1954) 7.HA.10  [no]  Note: incomplete description, might be a Mg-umohoite.  
Coutinhoite (IMA2003-025) 9.AK.30   [no]
Covellite (Y: 1832) 2.CA.05a    (IUPAC: copper sulfide)
Cowlesite (zeolitic tectosilicate: IMA1975-016) 9.GG.05   
Coyoteite (IMA1978-042) 2.FD.25    (IUPAC: sodium triiron pentasulfide dihydrate)

Cr – Cy 
Crandallite (alunite, crandallite: IMA1999 s.p., 1917 Rd) 8.BL.10    (IUPAC: calcium trialuminium hexahydro phosphate hydroxophosphate)
Cranswickite (IMA2010-016) 7.CB.15  [no] [no] (IUPAC: magnesium sulfate tetrahydrate)
Crawfordite (bradleyite: IMA1993-030) 5.BF.10    (IUPAC: trisodium strontium phosphate carbonate)
Creaseyite (IMA1974-044) 9.HH.15   
Crednerite (Y: 1849) 4.AB.05    (IUPAC: copper(II) manganese(II) dioxide)
Creedite (Y: 1916) 3.CG.15    (IUPAC: tricalcium dialuminium dihydro sulfate octafluoride dihydrate)
Crerarite (rocksalt, galena: IMA1994-003) 2.LB.45   
Crichtonite (crichtonite: IMA1980 s.p., 1814) 4.CC.40   
Criddleite (IMA1987-037) 2.LA.25   
Crimsonite (carminite: IMA2014-095) 8.0  [no] [no] (IUPAC: lead diiron(III) dihydro diphosphate)
Cristobalite (cristobalite: 1887) 4.DA.15    (IUPAC: dioxosilicate)
Crocobelonite (IMA2020-005) 8.0  [no] [no]
Crocoite (monazite: 1763) 7.FA.20    (IUPAC: lead(II) chromate)
Cronstedtite (serpentine: 1821) 9.ED.15   
Cronusite (IMA1999-018) 2.FB.05    (Ca0.2CrS2·2H2O)
Crookesite (Y: 1867) 2.BD.50    (IUPAC: heptacopper thallium tetraselenide)
Crowningshieldite (IMA2018-072) 2.0  [no] [no] ((Ni0.9Fe0.10)S)
Cryobostryxite (IMA2014-058) 3.0  [no] [no] (IUPAC: potassium zinc trichloride dihydrate)
Cryolite (double perovskite: 1799) 3.CB.15    (IUPAC: trisodium hexafluoroaluminate)
Cryolithionite (garnet: 1904) 3.CB.05    (Na3Al2(LiF4)3)
Cryptochalcite (cryptochalcite: IMA2014-106) 7.0  [no] [no] (IUPAC: dipotassium pentacopper oxopentasulfate)
Cryptohalite (fluorosilicate: 1872) 3.CH.15    (IUPAC: diammonium hexafluorosilicate)
Cryptomelane (hollandite, coronadite: IMA1982 s.p.?, 1942) 4.DK.05a    (K((Mn4+)7Mn3+)O16) 
Cryptophyllite (IMA2008-061) 9.0    (IUPAC: dipotassium calcium decaoxytetrasilicate pentahydrate)
Cualstibite (hydrotalcite: IMA1983-068 Rd) 4.FB.10    (IUPAC: dicopper aluminium hexahydroxide [antimony hexahydroxide])
Cuatrocapaite
Cuatrocapaite-(K) (IMA2018-084) 4.0  [no] [no]
Cuatrocapaite-(NH4) (IMA2018-083) 4.0  [no] [no]
Cubanite (cubanite: 1843) 2.CB.55a    (IUPAC: copper diiron trisulfide)
Cuboargyrite (rocksalt, galena: IMA1997-004) 2.JA.15    (IUPAC: silver disulfa antimonide)
Cubothioplumbite (IMA2021-091)
Cumengeite (IMA2007 s.p., 1893) 3.DB.20    (Pb21Cu20Cl42(OH)40·6H2O)
Cummingtonite [Mg-Fe-Mn-amphibole: IMA2012 s.p., 1824] 09.DE.05   
Cupalite (alloy: IMA1983-084) 1.AA.20    (IUPAC: copper aluminide)
Cuprite (Y: 1845) 4.AA.10    (IUPAC: dicopper(I) oxide)
CuproaurideQ (Y: 1939) 1.AA.10a  [no] [no] (IUPAC: tricopper gold alloy) Note: it might be auricupride.
Cuprobismutite (Y: 1884) 2.JA.10a    (Cu8AgBi13S24)
Cuprocopiapite (copiapite: 1938) 7.DB.35    (IUPAC: copper tetrairon dihydro hexasulfate icosahydrate)
Cuprodongchuanite (dongchuanite: IMA2021-065) [no] [no] [no]
Cuproiridsite (spinel, linnaeite: IMA1984-016) 2.DA.05    (IUPAC: copper diiridium tetrasulfide) 
Cuprokalininite (spinel, linnaeite: IMA2010-008) 2.DA.05  [no]  (IUPAC: copper dichromium tetrasulfide)
Cupromakopavonite (pavonite: IMA2005-036) 2.JA.05a  [no] [no] (Cu8Pb4Ag3Bi19S38)
Cupromakovickyite (pavonite: IMA2002-058) 2.JA.05d    (Cu4AgPb2Bi9S18) 
Cupromolybdite (vergasovaite: IMA2011-005) 7.  [no]  (IUPAC: tricopper(II) oxo dimolybdate)
Cuproneyite (neyite: IMA2008-053) 2.JB.25i  [no] [no] (Cu7Pb27Bi25S68)
Cupropavonite (pavonite: IMA1978-033) 2.JA.05a    (Cu0.9Ag0.5Pb0.6Bi2.5S5)
Cupropearceite (pearceite-polybasite: IMA2007-046) 2.GB.15   [no] ([Cu6As2S7][Ag9CuS4])
Cupropolybasite (pearceite-polybasite: IMA2008-004) 2.GB.15   [no] ([Cu6Sb2S7][Ag9CuS4])
Cuprorhodsite (spinel, linnaeite: IMA2017-H, IMA1984-017) 2.DA.05    (((Cu1+)0.5(Fe3+)0.5)(Rh3+)2S4)
Cuprorivaite (gillespite: IMA1962 s.p., 1938 Rd) 9.EA.05    (IUPAC: calcium copper decaoxy tetrasilicate)
Cuprosklodowskite (Y: 1933) 9.AK.10    (IUPAC: copper diuranyl di(hydrotrioxysilicate) hexahydrate)
Cuprospinel (spinel, spinel: IMA1971-020) 4.BB.05    (IUPAC: copper(II) diiron(III) tetraoxide)
Cuprostibite (metalloid alloy: 1969) 2.AA.20    (IUPAC: dicopper (antimony,thallium))
Cuprotungstite (Y: 1869) 7.GB.15    (IUPAC: tricopper(II) dihydro ditungstate) 
Cuprozheshengite (IMA2021-095a)
Curetonite (laueite, laueite: IMA1978-065) 8.BK.15   
Curienite (fritzscheite: IMA1967-049) 4.HB.15    (IUPAC: lead diuranyl divanadate pentahydrate)
Curite (Y: 1921) 4.GB.55   
Currierite (IMA2016-030) 8.0  [no] [no] (Na4Ca3MgAl4(AsO3OH)12·9H2O)
Cuspidine (woehlerite: 1876) 9.BE.17    (IUPAC: octacalcium tetrafluoro heptaoxodisilicate)
Cuyaite (IMA2019-126) 4.0  [no] [no]
Cuzticite (tellurium oxysalt: IMA1980-071) 4.FM.35    (IUPAC: diiron(II) tellurium(VI) hexaoxide trihydrate)
Cyanochroite (picromerite: 1855) 7.CC.60    (IUPAC: dipotassium copper disulfate hexahydrate)
Cyanotrichite (cyanotrichite: IMA1967 s.p., 1839) 7.DE.10    (IUPAC: tetracopper dialuminium dodecahydro sulfate diwater)
Cylindrite (cylindrite: 1893) 2.HF.25a    (IUPAC: iron tripalladium tetratin tetrasulfa diantimonide)
Cymrite (Y: 1949) 9.EG.05   
Cyprine (vesuvianite: IMA2015-044) 9.BG.35  [no] [no]
Cyrilovite (wardite: 1953) 8.DL.10    (IUPAC: sodium triiron(III) tetrahydro diphosphate dihydrate)
Czochralskiite (aphthitalite: IMA2015-011) 8.0  [no] [no] (IUPAC: tetrasodium tricalcium magnesium tetraphosphate)

External links
IMA Database of Mineral Properties/ RRUFF Project
Mindat.org - The Mineral Database
Webmineral.com
Mineralatlas.eu minerals C